The 1964 Paris–Nice was the 22nd edition of the Paris–Nice cycle race and was held from 9 March to 17 March 1964. The race started in Paris and finished in Nice. The race was won by Jan Janssen of the Pelforth team.

General classification

References

1964
1964 in road cycling
1964 in French sport
March 1964 sports events in Europe
1964 Super Prestige Pernod